Daniel Nestor and Kristina Mladenovic were the defending champions, but lost in the semifinals to Max Mirnyi and Chan Hao-ching.

Nenad Zimonjić and Samantha Stosur defeated Mirnyi and Chan in the final, 6–4, 6–2 to win the mixed doubles tennis title at the 2014 Wimbledon Championships.

Seeds
All seeds received a bye into the second round. 

  Mike Bryan /  Katarina Srebotnik (second round)
  Bob Bryan /  Květa Peschke (third round)
  Alexander Peya /  Abigail Spears (second round)
  Leander Paes /  Cara Black (second round)
  Daniel Nestor /  Kristina Mladenovic (semifinals)
  Horia Tecău /  Sania Mirza (third round)
  Rohan Bopanna /  Andrea Hlaváčková (third round)
  Jean-Julien Rojer /  Anna-Lena Grönefeld (withdrew)
  David Marrero /  Arantxa Parra Santonja (second round)
  Jamie Murray /  Casey Dellacqua (quarterfinals)
  Juan Sebastián Cabal /  Raquel Kops-Jones (second round)
  John Peers /  Ashleigh Barty (third round)
  Bruno Soares /  Martina Hingis (quarterfinals)
  Max Mirnyi /  Chan Hao-ching (final)
  Nenad Zimonjić /  Samantha Stosur (champions)
  Aisam-ul-Haq Qureshi /  Vera Dushevina (semifinals)

Draw

Finals

Top half

Section 1

Section 2

Bottom half

Section 3

Section 4

References

External links

2014 Wimbledon Championships on WTAtennis.com
2014 Wimbledon Championships – Doubles draws and results at the International Tennis Federation

X=Mixed Doubles
Wimbledon Championship by year – Mixed doubles